Brezno (or) is a town in central Slovakia with a population of around 21,000.

Geography
Brezno is located within the Horehronské podolie basin. Brezno lies between the Low Tatras mountain range and the Slovak Ore Mountains, both of which belong to the Inner Western Carpathians.

History
The area has been inhabited since prehistoric times, but the current town arose from an old Slovak settlement, next to which newly arrived German miners erected a typical market square in the early 13th century. The first written evidence of the town's existence is dated 1265 when King Béla IV of Hungary issued a charter for hunters from the area of Liptov, allowing them to use the woods around the settlement known as Berezuno. The name is derived from the Slovak word "breza" for birch.  In the nineteenth century Brezno was a typical, almost purely Slovak town and was one of the centers of the Slovak national movement.

After the Second World War the town developed into an industrial center. By far the largest industrial concern was Mostaren Brezno, a construction company which specialized in crane construction for the whole of Central Europe. Mostaren Brezno's restructuring in the early '90s caused high unemployment in the whole region. Since the late '90s, Brezno has built a large retail sector and promoted itself and the whole region as a tourist destination. Sports games and events such as the World Cup Biathlon and golf championships are held regularly.

Sports
The town's three sports clubs with the highest attendance are HC Brezno, FC Brezno and Biathlon Club Brezno. Other sports clubs include Volleyball Club Brezno, Cycle Club Brezno, and Swim Club Brezno.

The hockey club HC Brezno represents the town as part of the 1st senior league since the 2009/10 season. Therefore, the Brezno town council decided to reconstruct it's indoor stadium in 2009. During the reconstruction, new seats were added and the stadium was renamed the Brezno Arena; total capacity was increased to 2,500 seats.

Demographics

According to the 2013 census, the town had 21,534 inhabitants.

According to the 2001 census 92.85% of the inhabitants were Slovaks, 4.63% Roma, 0.80% Czechs and 0.22% Hungarian. The religious makeup was 66.89% Roman Catholics, 18.54% people with no religious affiliation, 8.57% Lutherans, and 0.98% Greek Catholics.

Notable people
Ivan Bella, cosmonaut
Ján Chalupka, writer
Pavol Habera, singer
Ottó Herman, ornithologist
Jozef Karika, experimental writer and publicist
Karol Kuzmány, writer
Miroslav Leitner, ski mountaineer
Martin Rázus, writer
Petr Sepéši, singer
Adriana Sklenaříková, fashion model
Dušan Švantner, politician

Twin towns – sister cities

Brezno is twinned with:

 Ciechanów, Poland
 Čačak, Serbia
 Meudon, France
 Nădlac, Romania
 Nový Bydžov, Czech Republic

Gallery

See also
 List of municipalities and towns in Slovakia

References

Genealogical resources
The records for genealogical research are available at the state archive "Státný Archiv in Banská Bystrica, Slovakia"
 Roman Catholic church records (births/marriages/deaths): 1656-1904 (parish A)
 Lutheran church records (births/marriages/deaths): 1784-1896 (parish A)

External links

 Official website of Brezno
 Surnames of living people in Brezno
 Official website of HC Brezno
 Official website of the Slovak State Archive in Banská Bystrica

Brezno